Elsa Søllesvik (born 22 April 1996), known professionally as Elsie Bay, is a Norwegian singer and songwriter.

Early life
Søllesvik grew up in Sunde, Kvinnherad, Vestland, before moving to Haugesund at the age of 13. She found her interest in music ever since she was a child.

Career

2010–2018: Elsa & Emilie
In 2010, Søllesvik met Emilie Haaland Austrheim and formed a duo Elsa & Emilie. In 2014, the duo signed a contract with record label Sony Music and released their debut album Endless Optimism the same year. The duo was nominated for Best New Artist at the 2014 Spellemannprisen, annual Norwegian music award. "Run", a track from the album, gained popularity after being featured in the first season of the television series Skam in 2017.

In 2017, they released their sophomore album, Kill Your Darlings with singles "Au volant" and "Chains and Promises". In 2018, the duo announced their split to focus on Søllesvik's solo career.

2018–present: Solo career and 
After the split of Elsa & Emilie, Søllesvik moved to Oslo to establish herself as a songwriter for other artists. She performed the opening theme of the third part of Korean television series Show Window: The Queen's House, titled "Heaven Made".

She finished as one of the top four finalists. Apart from her own entry, she also co-wrote "Hammer of Thor", performed by Oda Gondrosen, which qualified to the final.

She returned to the competition a year later with the song "Love You in a Dream" with Andreas Stone Johansson and Tom Oehler, qualifying for the final and placing fourth. She also co-wrote Eline Thorp's entry titled "Not Meant to Be", which also qualified for the final, placing sixth.

Discography

Singles

References

Living people
1996 births
Musicians from Haugesund
Norwegian songwriters
Norwegian pop singers
Melodi Grand Prix contestants
21st-century Norwegian singers
21st-century Norwegian women singers